The President's Council on Sports, Fitness and Nutrition (PCSFN) is an American government organization that aims to "promote, encourage and motivate Americans of all ages to become physically active and participate in sports". It is part of the Office of Public Health and Science, an agency of the United States Department of Health and Human Services. Prior to June 2010, it was called the President's Council on Physical Fitness and Sports. 

The Council's work is informed by a Science Board, composed primarily of academic researchers and scholars. The first Science Board was appointed during the George W. Bush administration in 2003 with Charles B. "Chuck" Corbin, Ph.D., Arizona State University, serving as its inaugural Chair. In 2016, Dr. Corbin received a Lifetime Achievement Award from the PCSFN.

The Science Board was active for several years, but eventually went dormant. It was reinstated on June 21, 2019, with strong urging from organizations such as the National Academy of Kinesiology.

A newly formed Science Board was announced on January 22, 2020, with Bradley J. Cardinal, Ph.D., Oregon State University, appointed as Chair. During their 2 year term, the Science Board established the scientific basis of the National Youth Sports Strategy, including a wide variety of evidence-based documents and reports.

History
During the 1940s, the American Medical Association and the National Committee on Physical Fitness had a joint committee encouraging physical fitness.

The President's Council on Youth Fitness was founded on July 16, 1956, to encourage American children.

In 1963, President Kennedy changed the council's name to President's Council on Physical Fitness to reflect its role to serve all Americans.

In 1966, President Lyndon B. Johnson created the Presidential Physical Fitness Award, the name of which was later changed to President's Challenge Youth Physical Fitness Awards Program. In 1968, the council's name was changed to President's Council on Physical Fitness and Sports to emphasize the importance of sports in life.

In 1972, the Presidential Sports Award Program was created.

In 1983, the United States Congress declared May as National Physical Fitness and Sports Month.

In 1996, the Surgeon General's Report on Physical Activity and Health was released. In 1997, the Council released its report on Physical Activity and Sport in the Lives of Boys.

In June 2010, President Barack Obama renamed the agency the President's Council on Fitness, Sports and Nutrition, with a new emphasis on nutrition as an element of fitness. First Lady Michelle Obama announced the new commission's goal "to end the epidemic of childhood obesity in a generation" and also announced that the president had named, as the new co-chairs of the council, New Orleans Saints quarterback Drew Brees and former Olympic gymnast Dominique Dawes.

On January 11, 2012, operators of the website for participants of the Challenge and Active Lifestyle programs learned that the site had been hacked, resulting in the release of personal information of the participants. The President's Challenge site displayed a notice that it was down for "Site Maintenance – We're taking a little breather." On January 20, 2012, the site was modified to explain the hacking. On January 27, 2012, The President's Challenge sent out emails to its participants saying that the website was functional as of January 24, 2012, and asked participants to reset their user passwords.

Past chairpersons

Bud Wilkinson (chairman) 1961–1963
Stan Musial Consultant 1964–1967
Jim Lovell (chairman) 1969–1977
Jerry Apodaca (chairman) 1978–1980
George Allen (chairman) 1981–1988
Dick Kazmaier (chairman) 1988–1989
Arnold Schwarzenegger (chairman) 1990–1993
Florence Griffith Joyner (co-chair) 1993–1998
Tom McMillen (co-chair) 1993–1997
Lee Haney (chairman) 1999-2002
Lynn Swann (chairman) 2002–2005
Denise Austin 2002–2009
Drew Brees (co-chair) 2010
Dominique Dawes (co-chair) 2010
Lou Ferrigno 2018
Misty May-Treanor (co-chair) 2019
Mariano Rivera (co-chair) 2019
Herschel Walker (co-chair) 2019

The current co-chairs of the Council are Jose Andres and Elena Delle Donne, serving since March 23, 2022.

Awards
The Council publishes guidelines for awards that are given out. They are the Presidential Physical Fitness Award, the National Physical Fitness Award, and the Participant Physical Fitness Award. However, it has been announced that the Physical Fitness Test on which these awards are based will no longer be available after the 2012–2013 school year. Additionally, there is the Active Lifestyle Award for staying active and the Presidential Champions Award for raising one's amount of activity. The Champions awards ended on 30 June 2018. There is also a Community Leadership Award that is given out annually to 50 people or organizations for encouraging physical activity, fitness, and nutrition.

Standardized tests
The award was given to students who achieved the top fifteenth percentile cumulative scores across these events and were based on age/gender and were taken by all participants. Pull ups/flexed-arm hang was based on gender and was the only event where one was done by boys and the other by girls:
 50-yard dash
 600-yard run
 Standing broad jump
 Pull-ups (boys)
 Flexed-arm hang (girls)
 Sit-ups
 Shuttle run
 Sit and reach

See also
 The President's Challenge

References

External links

 

Office of the Assistant Secretary for Health
Sports nutrition
United States national commissions
1956 establishments in the United States